Basangouda Ramangouda Patil Yatnal   (born 13 December 1963) is an Indian BJP politician who was the Minister of state for Textiles from 1 July 2002 to 8 September 2003 and Minister of state for Railways from 8 September 2003 to 16 May 2004 and current MLA from Bijapur City Assembly constituency since 2018. He has been a member of parliament from the Bijapur constituency for two terms and has been a member of the legislative council from the Bijapur Local Authorities constituency for one term.

Political career 
Yatnal contested as a candidate of the Bharatiya Janata Party and was elected from the Bijapur constituency in the 1994 Karnataka Legislative Assembly election. In the 1999 Indian general election, he contested and was elected from the Bijapur constituency of the Lok Sabha. He was re-elected to the Lok Sabha in the 2004 Indian general election. He was denied candidacy to contest on behalf of the Bharatiya Janata Party in the 2009 Indian general election.

In 2010, he joined the Janata Dal (Secular). In the 2013 Karnataka Legislative Assembly election, he contested as a candidate of the Janata Dal (Secular) but lost the election from the Bijapur constituency. He later rejoined the Bharatiya Janata Party after being denied the post of state president by the Janata Dal (Secular) in the same year.

In 2015, he was expelled from the Bharatiya Janata Party for 6 years for not withdrawing his nomination as an independent candidate for the twin constituencies of the Bijapur Local Authorities constituency of the Karnataka Legislative Council. He won the election alongside S. R. Patil of the Indian National Congress.

In 2018, he was re-inducted into the Bharatiya Janata Party after 3 years. The Deccan Chronicle noted that his adoption of a hardcore Hindu nationalist stance and support of the Lingayat community aided him in being considered by the party president Amit Shah without understanding the local politics and BSY capability. He contested as a candidate of the Bharatiya Janata Party and won the election for a 2nd time from the Bijapur constituency in the 2018 Karnataka Legislative Assembly election.

In February 2020, Yatnal sparked a row by calling centenarian freedom fighter H. S. Doreswamy, a Pakistani agent.

On 9 November 2020, Yatnal had a jibe at Islamic and Christian festivals and practices and called for “noiseless Fridays, bloodless Bakrid and cracker-less New Year Eve”.

Positions held

 Member, Karnataka Legislative Assembly - 1994-1999.
 Member, 13th Loksabha - 1999.
 Member, Committee on Industry - 1999-2002
 Member, Parliament Committee on Industry.
 Member, Parliament Committee on Private Members' Bills and Resolutions - 1999-2002
 Member, Parliamentary Consultative Committee, Ministry of Human Resources Development - 2000-2002
 Union Minister of State, Ministry of Textiles: 1 July 2002 - 8 Sept. 2003
 Union Minister of State, Ministry of Railways: 8 Sept. 2003 - May 2004
 Member, 14th Loksabha - 2004. (Reelected)
 Member, Parliament Committee on Labour.
 Member, Parliament House Committee.
 Member, Parliament Committee on Members of Parliament Local Area Development Scheme.
 Member of legislative council ( 2015–2018)
 Member of legislative assembly (2018–Present)

References

External links
 Mr. Patils Home Page on the Parliament of India's Website

1963 births
Living people
India MPs 1999–2004
India MPs 2004–2009
Politicians from Bangalore
Lok Sabha members from Karnataka
Bharatiya Janata Party politicians from Karnataka
Janata Dal (Secular) politicians
Karnataka MLAs 2018–2023